Oued Taourira is a town and commune in Sidi Bel Abbès Province in northwestern Algeria.

References

Communes of Sidi Bel Abbès Province